Szymon Wojciech Sajnok (born 24 August 1997) is a Polish road and track cyclist, who currently rides for UCI ProTeam .

Career
As a junior, he participated at the 2014 UCI Road World Championships in the Men's junior time trial and at the 2015 UCI Road World Championships also in the Men's junior time trial. On the track he competed at the 2016 UEC European Track Championships in the elimination race event and team pursuit event.

In August 2019, he was named in the startlist for the 2019 Vuelta a España.

In September 2020, Sajnok signed a two-year contract with the  team, from the 2021 season.

Major results

Road

2015
 1st  Time trial, National Junior Road Championships
 1st Stage 2 Coupe du Président de la Ville de Grudziądz
 5th Paris–Roubaix Juniors
2016
 7th GP Slovakia
2017
 1st Prologue Tour de Kumano
 2nd Time trial, National Under-23 Road Championships
2018
 1st   Overall Dookoła Mazowsza
1st  Young rider classification
1st Prologue, Stages 1 & 2
 2nd Memoriał Romana Siemińskiego
 3rd Rund um Köln
 7th Overall Szlakiem Walk Majora Hubala
1st  Points classification
 9th Münsterland Giro
2019
 1st  Time trial, National Under-23 Road Championships
 4th Bredene Koksijde Classic
2020
 2nd Road race, National Road Championships

Grand Tour general classification results timeline

Track

2016
 1st  Omnium – Apeldoorn, UCI Track World Cup
 2nd  Omnium, UEC European Under-23 Track Championships
2017
 1st  Omnium – Los Angeles, UCI Track World Cup
 National Track Championships
1st  Omnium
1st  Points race
1st  Scratch race
2018
 1st  Omnium, UCI Track World Championships

Mountain
2014
 1st  National Junior Cross-country Championships
 3rd Cross-country eliminator, Summer Youth Olympics

Cyclo-cross
2013–2014
 2nd National Junior Cyclo-cross Championships
2014–2015
 1st  National Junior Cyclo-cross Championships

References

External links

1997 births
Living people
Polish male cyclists
People from Kartuzy
Cyclists at the 2014 Summer Youth Olympics
UCI Track Cycling World Champions (men)
Polish track cyclists
Cyclists at the 2020 Summer Olympics
Olympic cyclists of Poland
21st-century Polish people